Edge of the World is an album created by Judas Priest guitarist Glenn Tipton, The Who bassist John Entwistle, and drummer Cozy Powell. The album was released on 7 March 2006 by Rhino and WEA.

Background
Consisting of tracks that were not released on Baptizm of Fire, Tipton released the album on March 7, 2006 in memory of Entwistle and Powell. "I'm sure everyone will know," Tipton stated, "this album is a tribute to their unique styles and skills and a small part of the immense legacy they have left behind which will continue to inspire people all over the world for many years to come."
Glenn presented the tracks to Rhino/Warners Entertainment and they agreed that this album had to be released. This album was released March 7, 2006 and all proceeds from sales go to the Teenage Cancer Trust.

Reception
Greg Prato of AllMusic called the album, "more melodic than the average Judas Priest release, and one that focuses mostly on Tipton's riffs and Powell's thunderous drumming rather than Entwistle's bass dexterity. Additionally, Tipton's vocals certainly won't be mistaken for Rob Halford's anytime soon, but they're certainly not cringe-worthy, either." Keith Bergman of Blabbermouth.net added, "Chief offender is Tipton's self-confessed bad singing voice — at his best, he's barely passable, a county-fair Paul Rodgers with a head cold. At his worst, he'll strain to hit a note and turn your stomach."

Track listing

Personnel
Tipton, Entwistle & Powell
Glenn Tipton – guitars, vocals
John Entwistle – bass
Cozy Powell – drums

Additional musicians
Don Airey – keyboards
Neil Murray – additional bass on track 11

Production
Produced and mixed by Glenn Tipton and Sean Lynch
Artwork by Mark Wilkinson

References

External links
www.glenntipton.com
www.judaspriest.com

2006 albums
Glenn Tipton albums
Rhino Records albums
Albums published posthumously